Trichostema nesophilum, known as dune blue curls, Bald Head blue curls, and Carolina blue curls, is a species of flowering plant endemic to coastal dune grasslands in the southeastern United States. It was first formally described in 2019 by R. Kevan S. McClelland and Alan S. Weakley in the Journal of the Botanical Research Institute of Texas. The specific epithet nesophilum is from the Greek for "island" and "loving", named for its habitat—barrier islands along the coasts of North Carolina and South Carolina.

References

nesophilum
Endemic flora of the United States
Plants described in 2019
Taxa named by Alan Stuart Weakley
Flora without expected TNC conservation status